Euerbach is a municipality in the district of Schweinfurt in Bavaria, Germany. Its motto is "Faszination Kultur und Natur", meaning, "Fascination of culture and nature."

References

Schweinfurt (district)